Glycopyrronium bromide is a medication of the muscarinic anticholinergic group. It does not cross the blood–brain barrier and consequently has few to no central effects. It is given by mouth, via intravenous injection, on the skin, and via inhalation. It is a synthetic quaternary ammonium compound. The cation, which is the active moiety, is called glycopyrronium (INN) or glycopyrrolate (USAN).

The most common side effects include irritability, flushing, blocked nose, reduced secretions in the airways, dry mouth, constipation, diarrhea, vomiting and inability to completely empty the bladder (urinary retention).

In September 2012, glycopyrronium was approved for medical use in the European Union. In June 2018, glycopyrronium was approved by the US Food and Drug Administration (FDA) to treat excessive underarm sweating, becoming the first drug developed specifically to reduce excessive sweating. It is on the World Health Organization's List of Essential Medicines.

Medical uses
Glycopyrronium was first used in 1961 to treat peptic ulcers. Since 1975, intravenous glycopyrronium has been used before surgery to reduce salivary, tracheobronchial, and pharyngeal secretions. It is also used in conjunction with neostigmine, a neuromuscular blocking reversal agent, to prevent neostigmine's muscarinic effects such as bradycardia. It can be administered to raise the heart rate in bradycardia, which often will also increase the blood pressure.

It is also used to reduce excessive saliva (sialorrhea), and to treat Ménière's disease.

It has been used topically and orally to treat hyperhidrosis, in particular, gustatory hyperhidrosis.

In inhalable form it is used to treat chronic obstructive pulmonary disease (COPD). Doses for inhalation are much lower than oral ones, so that swallowing a dose will not have an effect.

Side effects
Dry mouth, urinary retention, headaches, vomiting, diarrhea, constipation, blurry vision are possible side effects of the medication.

Pharmacology

Mechanism of action
Glycopyrronium competitively blocks muscarinic receptors, thus inhibiting cholinergic transmission.

Pharmacokinetics
Glycopyrronium bromide affects the gastrointestinal tracts, liver and kidney but has a very limited effect on the brain and the central nervous system. In horse studies, after a single intravenous infusion, the observed tendencies of glycopyrronium followed a tri-exponential equation, by rapid disappearance from the blood followed by a prolonged terminal phase. Excretion was mainly in urine and in the form of an unchanged drug. Glycopyrronium has a relatively slow diffusion rate, and in a standard comparison to atropine, is more resistant to penetration through the blood-brain barrier and placenta.

Research
It has been studied in asthma.

References

External links
 
 

Muscarinic antagonists
Quaternary ammonium compounds
Pyrrolidines
Tertiary alcohols
Carboxylate esters
Peripherally selective drugs
Phenylcyclopentylglycolate esters